The 2003–04 Dayton Flyers men's basketball team represented the University of Dayton during the 2003–04 NCAA Division I men's basketball season. The Flyers, led by first year head coach Brian Gregory, played their home games at the University of Dayton Arena and were members of the Atlantic 10 Conference. They finished the season 24–9, 12–4 in A-10 play, finishing first in the A-10's West division. Dayton opened the season winning the Maui Invitational. The Flyers advanced to the finals of the Atlantic 10 tournament where they were defeated by rival Xavier. Dayton received an at-large bid to the NCAA tournament, the program's first consecutive NCAA appearances since the 1960s. The Flyers lost to DePaul in the first round.

Previous season
The 2002-03 Dayton Flyers finished the season with an overall record of 24–6, with a record of 13–2 in the Atlantic 10 regular season. The Flyers defeated Temple to win the Atlantic 10 tournament title. They received a bid to play in the NCAA tournament where they fell to Tulsa in the first round.

Offseason

Departures

Incoming recruits

Roster

Schedule

|-
!colspan=9 style="background:#C40023; color:#75B2DD;"| Non-conference regular season

|-
!colspan=9 style="background:#C40023; color:#75B2DD;"| Atlantic 10 regular season

|-
!colspan=9 style="background:#C40023; color:#75B2DD;"| Atlantic 10 tournament

|-
!colspan=9 style="background:#C40023; color:#75B2DD;"| NCAA tournament

References

Dayton Flyers men's basketball seasons
Dayton
Dayton
Dayton
Dayton